The Radical Party of Oleh Liashko (RPOL) and formerly known as the Ukrainian Radical-Democratic Party, is a political party in Ukraine that was registered in September 2010. It was primarily known for its radical populism, especially in the 2014 Ukrainian parliamentary election when it gained its largest support.

At the 2012 Ukrainian parliamentary election, the party had won 1 seat. The party won 22 seats at the 2014 Ukrainian parliamentary election. In the 2019 Ukrainian parliamentary election it lost all those seats.

History

Ukrainian Radical-Democratic Party 

The party was established at the founding congress in Mykolaiv on 18 August 2010 and was then named the Ukrainian Radical-Democratic Party. Under this name, it was registered with the Ministry of Justice of Ukraine on 28 September 2010. At the time, the party was led by Vladyslav Telipko.

Radical Party of Oleh Liashko 
During its third party congress on 8 August 2011, Oleh Liashko was elected the new party leader. The same day, the party changed its name to the Radical Party of Oleh Liashko.

At the 2012 Ukrainian parliamentary election, the party won 1.08% of the national votes and 1 constituency (it had competed in 28 constituencies) for its leader Liashko, who did not join a faction in the Verkhovna Rada. The party was most successful in Chernihiv Oblast, where it received 10.69 percent of the vote, finishing fifth. The constituency that Liashko won was also located in Chernihiv Oblast.

According to political scientist Tadeusz A. Olszański, in mid-September 2014 the party was "a typical one-man party, centred around Oleh Liashko; its real organisational potential remains a mystery". At the 2014 Ukrainian parliamentary election, the party's list was led by Liashko, with Serhii Melnychuk, commander of the Aidar Battalion, in third place, singer Zlata Ognevich in fourth place and Yurii Shukhevych, son of the military leader of the Ukrainian Insurgent Army Roman Shukhevych, in fifth place. At the election, the party won 22 seats. It received support from rural and regional voters who had previously supported Fatherland.

On 21 November 2014, the party became a member of the coalition supporting the second Yatsenyuk government and sent one minister into this government.

On 3 June 2015, the parliament stripped the party's MP Serhii Melnychuk of his parliamentary prosecutorial immunity rights as he was accused of forming a criminal gang, abductings and threatening people.

The Radical Party left the second Yatsenyuk government coalition on 1 September 2015 in protest over a vote in parliament involving a change to the Ukrainian Constitution that would lead to decentralization and greater powers for areas held by pro-Russian separatists. According to party leader Liashko, the party "can't stay in the coalition after anti-Ukrainian changes to the constitution, initiated by the president, were approved against the will of three parties of the coalition". He was referring to his own party, Self Reliance and Fatherland.

In the 2019 Ukrainian parliamentary election the party lost all its parliamentary seats, 
it gained about 1% too little to clear the 5% election threshold and also did not win an electoral district seat. The party had participated in 65 single-mandate majority electoral districts.

In the 2020 Ukrainian local elections 535 people won seats in local councils on behalf of the party, that is about 1.62% of the available seats.

Ideology and stances 
Observers had defined the party as left-wing, right-wing, and far-right. The Radical Party is centered on Liashko, who is known for his populism and highly combative behavior. The party advocates a number of traditional left-leaning positions on economics such as lower salary taxes, a ban on agricultural land sale and eliminating the illegal land market, a tenfold increase in budget spending on health and setting up primary health centres in every village and mixes them with strong nationalist sentiments. Anton Shekhovtsov of University College London considers Liashko's party to be similar to populist and nationalist. A similar view is shared by political scientist Mattia Zulianello.

The party has promised to purify the country of oligarchs "with a pitchfork". It has proposed higher taxes on products manufactured by oligarchs and a crisis tax on the latter.

The party wants to re-arm Ukraine with nuclear weapons. The party also advocates an end to the Russo-Ukrainian War by the use of force.

Party leader Liashko had stressed in May 2011 he had nothing against sexual minorities. In a September 2015 interview with Ukrayinska Pravda, he stated that being an LGBT person "is the choice of each individual. I can not condemn".

Party leaders 
 Vladyslav Telipko (2010–2011)
 Oleh Liashko (2011–present)

Election results

Verkhovna Rada

Presidential elections

See also
:Category:Radical Party of Oleh Liashko politicians

References

External links 
 
  

2010 establishments in Ukraine
Agrarian parties in Ukraine
Nationalist parties in Ukraine
Political parties established in 2010
Parliamentary factions in Ukraine